Brugmann's law, named for Karl Brugmann, is a sound law stating that in the Indo-Iranian languages, the earlier Proto-Indo-European  normally became  in Proto-Indo-Iranian but  in open syllables if it was followed by one consonant and another vowel.

Overview
The theory accounts for a number of otherwise puzzling facts. Latin  but ). Similarly, the vast majority of n-stem nouns in Indic have a long stem-vowel, such as  "Brahmins",  "dogs" (from ), correlating with information from other Indo-European languages that they were originally *on-stems. There are also some exceptions, including  "ox", which in the earliest Indic text, the Rigveda, shows forms as  "oxen". They were later replaced by "regular" formations ( and so on, some as early as the Rigveda itself), but the notion that the short stem vowel might have been from an -stem is supported by the unique morphology of the Germanic forms: Old English  nominative singular "ox",  plural; the Old English plural stem, such as the nominative, continues Proto-Germanic  < , with e > i in noninitial syllables followed, in Old English, by an umlaut. This is the only Old English n-stem that certainly points to -vocalism, rather than -vocalism.

Exceptions 
Non-apophonic , with no alternant, developed into Indo-Iranian :  "master, lord" > Sanskrit , not  (there is no such root as  "rule, dominate"). Alternatively, it is explained by the voiceless consonant after the vowel (see also Sanskrit  < ), but to adopt a form of the sound law that affects only  in open syllables, followed by a voiced consonant, seems to be a slim basis for a rule that is so general in Indo-Iranian. Limiting the original environment to that before voiceless consonants then requires levelling of long-vowel forms to perfects and nouns with final voiceless consonants in Pre-Indo-Iranian. That faces particular problems in explaining the archaic form  'he/she has reached' < , with its very idiosyncratic synchronic relation to Sanskrit  'reach'.

Several exceptions can be addressed by the laryngeal theory.

That is,  "saw" is both first- and third-person singular, but a form like  would have been allowed by Sanskrit syllable structure. In other words, while Brugmann's Law was still operative, a form of the type  in the first-person singular did not have an open root syllable.

A problem for the interpretation is that roots that quite plainly must have ended in a consonant cluster including a laryngeal, such as  <  "beget" and therefore should have had a short vowel throughout (like  "see" < ) nevertheless show the same patterning as :  first-person singular,  third-person singular. Whether that is a catastrophic failure of the theory or just levelling is unsure, but after all, those who think the pattern seen in roots like  has a morphological, not phonological, origin, have their own headaches, such as the total failure of this "morphological" development to include roots ending in two consonants. Such an argument would anyway cut the ground out from under the neat distributions seen in the kinship terms, the special behaviour of "ox" and so on.

Perhaps the most worrisome data are adverbs such as Sanskrit , Greek  (< ) (meaning "motion from or to a place or location at a place", depending on the case of the noun that it governs) and some other forms, all of which appear to have ablauting vowels. They also all have a voiceless stop after the vowel, which may or may not be significant.

Current status 
Brugmann's Law is widely accepted among specialists in Indo-European and Indo-Iranic linguistics. Jerzy Kuryłowicz, the author of the explanation of the  matter (in his Études indoeuropéennes I), eventually abandoned his analysis for of an appeal to the theory of marked vs unmarked morphological categories.

References

Further reading
 
 

Sound laws
Indo-European linguistics
Indo-Iranian languages